Wilfrid-Étienne Brunet (October 21, 1832 – March 7, 1899) was a Canadian pharmacist and the founder of the company Brunet.

Born in Quebec City, Lower Canada, the son of Jean-Olivier Brunet and Cécile-Adélaide Lagueux, Brunet studied at the Petit Séminaire de Québec from 1841 to 1850. From 1850 to 1855, he studied chemistry and pharmacy with his brother-in-law who was a pharmacist, Pierre-O. Giroux. In 1855, he opened a store in Quebec City. He received his license as a chemist and pharmacist in 1858.

In 1876, he became a Quebec City Councillor for the Saint-Roch ward.

References
 

1832 births
1899 deaths
Canadian pharmacists
Quebec City councillors
Canadian people of Norman descent